Celles is a village of Wallonia and a district of the municipality of Houyet, located in the province of Namur, Belgium.

It is a member of the heritage group Les Plus Beaux Villages de Wallonie ("The Most Beautiful Villages of Wallonia").

It is served by Gendron-Celles railway station, located several kilometres south-west of the village centre, next to the river Lesse.

The Château de Vêves is near the village.

It was one of the farthest points that the Wehrmacht advanced during the Battle of the Bulge (December 1944) in World War II, which is commemorated by a preserved Panther tank.

External links
 Website of Les Plus Beaux Villages de Wallonie: Celles

Notes and References

Former municipalities of Namur (province)